Amrutham may refer to:

 Amrutham (film), 2004 Indian Malayalam-language film
 Amrutham (TV series), Indian Telugu-language television series 
Amrutham Chandamamalo, 2014 Indian Telugu-language space film
Amrutham Dhvitheeyam, Indian Telugu-language series and a sequel to Amrutham (TV series)
Amrutham Gamaya, a 1987 Indian Malayalam-language film